Bad Hair Day is a 1996 album by Weird Al Yankovic.

Bad Hair Day may also refer to:

Television and film
 "Bad Hare Day" (Brandy & Mr. Whiskers), a television episode of Brandy & Mr. Whiskers
 "Bad Hair Day" (Courage the Cowardly Dog), a television episode of Courage the Cowardly Dog
 "Bad Hair Day" (Modern Family), a television episode of Modern Family
 "Bad Hair Day" (Sailor Moon), a television episode of Sailor Moon
 Bad Hair Day (film), a 2015 Disney television movie
 "Bad Hair Day", an episode of season 3 of Phineas and Ferb

Other uses
 Bad Hair Day: The Videos, a set of videos released in 1996 by Weird Al Yankovic
 Agave 'Bad Hair Day', a variety of Mangave

See also 
 Bad Hair (disambiguation)
 Bad Hare Day, a Goosebumps book